The 2008 WNBA season was the 11th season for the Washington Mystics women's professional basketball team. Despite a 10–16 record before the WNBA break for the Beijing Olympics, Mystics officials said that attendance at Verizon Center had risen from nearly 1,200 fans a game over the previous season, with total ticket revenue up 17 percent, and season-ticket sales for the 2008 season were up 20 percent from last season, bringing the team's base to nearly 3,000.

Off-season
On October 2, 2007, the Mystics announced that Tree Rollins would be named the permanent head coach. Rollins had been the interim head coach since the resignation of Richie Adubato on June 1, 2007.

Expansion draft
Yelena Leuchanka was selected in the 2008 Expansion Draft for the Atlanta Dream.

WNBA draft

Transactions

Trades

Free agents

Regular season
 On July 19, 2008, Tree Rollins was fired by the team after an 8–14 start. Assistant coach Jessie Kenlaw was named as interim head coach.

Season standings

Season schedule

Player stats

Regular season

Washington Mystics Regular Season Stats

Roster

References

External links
 Tree Rollins replaced by Jessie Kenlaw as Head Coach
 Mystics trade McWilliams-Franklin to the Shock

Washington
Washington Mystics
Washington Mystics seasons